Benjamin John Debenham (born 11 October 1967), known as Ben Debenham, is an English cricket umpire who has stood in first-class cricket matches since being named to the ECB Umpires List in 2012. He has also stood in a Women's One Day International cricket matches and Women's Twenty20 Internationals.

Born in Chelmsford, Essex, Debenham also represented Essex, playing for their Second XI as a left-handed batsman.

External links

1967 births
Living people
Sportspeople from Chelmsford
English cricket umpires